Mélissa Gal (born 26 October 1999) is a French cross-country skier. She competed in the  Women's 10 kilometre classical, and Women's sprint, at the 2022 Winter Olympics. She competed at the 2021–22 FIS Cross-Country World Cup.

Cross-country skiing results
All results are sourced from the International Ski Federation (FIS).

Olympic Games

World Championships

World Cup

Season standings

References

External links 

 Melissa Gal of Team France competes during the Olympic Games 2022, Women's Cross Country 10 km Classic

1999 births
Living people
French female cross-country skiers
Cross-country skiers at the 2022 Winter Olympics
Olympic cross-country skiers of France
21st-century French women